Muhammad Nawaz Marri was a Baloch Judge of Balochistan High Court in Quetta, Balochistan, Pakistan. He was the brother of justice Mir khuda baksh marri and uncle of Mir Shahnawaz khan marri who served as MPA, Minister of Balochistan, DG Mines and Minerals Balochistan and provincial secretary.

Murder
On Jan 7, 2000, Muhammad Nawaz Marri was murdered. The murder was alleged to be carried out by the orders of Khair Bakhsh Marri by his sons Balach Marri, Ghazan Marri and Mehran Marri.

External links
 KILLERS: Nawab Marri, three sons convicted in landmine case

See also
 Balochistan High Court
 Nawab Khair Bakhsh Marri 
 Hyrbyair Marri
 Balach Marri
 Changez Marri
 Ghazan Marri
 Mehran Marri
 Hamza Marri

References

Baloch people
Judges of the Balochistan High Court